Gabonius is a genus of flowering plants belonging to the family Fabaceae.

Its native range is Western Central Tropical Africa.

Species:

Gabonius ngouniensis

References

Fabaceae
Fabaceae genera